Janet Gillies (31 January 1864 – 24 July 1947) was a New Zealand civilian and military nurse, army nursing administrator. She was born in Wanganui, Wanganui, New Zealand on 31 January 1864. Between 1899 and 1902 she served as a nurse in the Second Boer War. She was awarded the King´s South Africa Medal. After returning to New Zealand, she became an advocate for the establishment of the New Zealand Army Nursing Service.

References

1864 births
1947 deaths
New Zealand nurses
New Zealand military personnel
People from Whanganui
New Zealand women nurses